The Dominican Summer League Nationals or DSL Nationals are a rookie-level Minor League Baseball team of the Dominican Summer League that began play in 2005. They are located in Boca Chica, Santo Domingo, Dominican Republic, and play their home games at Las Américas Complex. Two DSL Nationals squads existed between 2006 and 2008—DSL Nationals 1 and 2.

Roster

References

External links
Dominican Summer League Nationals page at MiLB.com

Baseball teams established in 2005
Dominican Summer League teams
Baseball teams in the Dominican Republic
Washington Nationals minor league affiliates
2005 establishments in the Dominican Republic